Google Closure Tools is a set of tools to help developers build rich web applications with JavaScript. It was developed by Google for use in their web applications such as Gmail, Google Docs and Google Maps.

Closure Compiler
The Closure Compiler is a tool for making JavaScript downloads run faster, at the expense of human readability. It does not compile from JavaScript to machine code, but rather compiles from JavaScript to more efficient JavaScript.   

It parses JavaScript, analyzes it, removes dead code and rewrites and minifies what is left. It also checks syntax, variable references, and types and warns about common JavaScript pitfalls. It supports transpiling modern ECMAScript code to ECMAScript 5, so that programmers can write JavaScript that uses those features, and run it in browsers or other environments that do not yet support them. (the Traceur Compiler is another Google project that supports transpiling ES6 to ES3.)

CLI based tools 
Tool set provide a command line tools used to optimize and compile .js files:

 Java-based application run from shell which compiles a list of specified JavaScript files
 npm package google-closure-compiler which provides as optional dependencies three compilers: native (binary executable), JAVA and JavaScript-based one; which are installed at once.

Others 
Interactively in the browser: 
The Closure Compiler service website provides a form for a user to input a URL pointing to a JavaScript source or enter JavaScript source code in a text box. The website will display with the optimized JavaScript on right side for the user to copy.
HTTP POST API:
The Closure Compiler server accepts HTTP POST requests. Parameters include the string of JavaScript to be optimized (or a URL pointing to it), the optimization level, whether to include errors and warnings, and the output format (JSON, XML, or text).

The Closure compiler also supports type checking via type annotations that must be written in JSDoc comments.

Ecosystem 
Programming languages that transpile to JavaScript benefit from Closure Tools. For example, Closure Compiler helps to make ClojureScript practical by making the compiled JavaScript code more efficient.

Closure Library
The Closure Library is a JavaScript library, written specifically to take advantage of the Closure Compiler, based on a modular architecture. It provides cross-browser functions for DOM manipulations and events, Ajax and JSON, as well as more high-level objects such as User Interface widgets and Controls.

Closure Templates
Closure Templates are a templating system for dynamically generating HTML in both Java and JavaScript.

Because the language was apparently referred to as "Soy" internal to Google, and "Soy" remains in some of the documentation and classes, sometimes Closure Templates are referred to as "Soy Templates".

Closure Stylesheets 
This is a compiler which provides an extended version of CSS, which is compiled down to ordinary CSS. Internally in Google, this extended version of CSS is referred to as GSS.

See also

 Google Web Toolkit
 JSDoc
 TypeScript
 Minification (programming)
 Source-to-source compiler

References

External links

Package for TYPO3 Flow

2009 software
Free software programmed in Java (programming language)
JavaScript libraries
Web development software
Closure Tools